The 1959–60 SM-sarja season was the 29th season of the SM-sarja, the top level of ice hockey in Finland. 10 teams participated in the league, and Ilves Tampere won the championship.

Regular season

External links
 Season on hockeyarchives.info

Fin
Liiga seasons
1959–60 in Finnish ice hockey